The hired armed ship Sir Thomas Troubridge or Thomas Troubridge, or Troubridge, or Trowbridge) was a ship that the Royal Navy put her under contract from 7 July 1804 to 9 May 1806. She was of 473  tons burthen (bm), and carried eighteen 6-pounder guns and eight 18-pounder carronades. She had a brief, astonishingly unremarkable career while under contract to the Navy.
 
Troubridge was one of four vessels that Mr. T. Lockyer, of Plymouth, owned that the government hired at the same time. In reporting the transaction, the Naval Chronicle described Trowbridge as armed with twenty 6-pounder guns and eight 18-pounder carronades.

Trowbridges commander from September 1804 was Commander William Bevians. Marshall's biographical note makes no mention of Bevians's period of command of Troubridge.

From 7 October 1804 on, Troubridge was permanently stationed at Galway.

Fate
Readily available records do not reveal what happened to Sir Thomas Troubridge after the Navy ended her contract.

Notes, citations, and references
Notes

Citations

References

Hired armed vessels of the Royal Navy